Gúdar-Javalambre is a comarca in Aragon, Spain. The most important town is Mora de Rubielos.

This comarca is located at the southern end of Aragon, bordering the Valencian Community. The area is mountainous with the summits of the Sistema Ibérico rising over towns with little or very little population in which the agricultural houses of the former villages have become summerhouses. 

The Sierra de Gúdar and the Sierra de Javalambre dominate the landscape and give their name to the comarca. The summits are covered in snow in the winter. The Aramón Javalambre ski resort is located in this comarca.

Municipalities

See also
Maestrazgo
Comarcas of Aragon

References

External links 

 Comarcas de Aragón, Gúdar-Javalambre
Gúdar-Javalambre, official comarca site
Aramón Javalambre

Comarcas of Aragon
Geography of the Province of Teruel